Flag of Kashmir may refer to:

Flag of Azad Kashmir, a symbol of Azad Kashmir, a region under of Pakistani administration
Flag of Jammu and Kashmir, a symbol of Jammu and Kashmir, a region under Indian administration